The 2019 Women's South American Volleyball Championship was the 33rd edition of the Women's South American Volleyball Championship held in Cajamarca, Peru and organised by South America's governing volleyball body, the Confederación Sudamericana de Voleibol (CSV).

Competing nations
The following national teams participated:

Preliminary round

Pool A

|}

|}

Pool B

|}

|}

Final round

5th–8th classification

5th–8th semifinals

|}

5th place match

|}

Championship

Semifinals

|}

Bronze medal match

|}

Final

|}

Final standing

Awards

Most Valuable Player
  Lorenne Teixeira
Best Setter
  María Marín
Best Outside Spikers
  Amanda Coneo
  Karla Ortiz

Best Middle Blockers
  Mara Leão
  Ana Beatriz Correa
Best Opposite Spiker
  Sol Piccolo
Best Libero
  Juliana Toro

See also

 South American Men's Volleyball Championship
 Women's U22 South American Volleyball Championship
 Women's Junior South American Volleyball Championship
 Girls' Youth South American Volleyball Championship
 Girls' U16 South American Volleyball Championship
 Volleyball at the Pan American Games
 Women's Pan-American Volleyball Cup

External links
Official website

Women's South American Volleyball Championships
South American Volleyball Championship
International volleyball competitions hosted by Peru
2019 in South American sport
South American Volleyball Championship
South American Volleyball Championship
September 2019 sports events in South America